Sangvi is a locality in the city of Pune, India. The locality is divided into two parts; New Sangvi and Old Sangvi.

Some of the nearby areas Pimple Gurav, Aundh, Dapodi, Khadki, Wakad, Hinjawadi, Pune University.

References 

Neighbourhoods in Pimpri-Chinchwad